The garifuna drum is a membranophone percussion from the Garifuna culture in Belize, Guatemala and Honduras. The garifuna drums play a very important role in garifuna music. There are two types of drums used, Primero (tenor drum) and Segunda (bass drum). These drums are made of hollowed out hardwood such as mahogany or mayflower, but other woods are also used. This percussion has one drumhead of skin from peccary pig, deer or sheep. The garifuna drums are played by the hands and are usually performed while seated.

References

External links 
Video - garifuna drum making
- more garifuna drum making
Video - garifuna drum strokes

Drums
Central American and Caribbean percussion instruments
Belizean musical instruments
Guatemalan musical instruments
Honduran musical instruments